Rezqabad (also Romanized as Rezqābād; also known as Zorqābād and Zarq Ābād) is a village in Rezqabad Rural District, in the Central District of Esfarayen County, North Khorasan Province, Iran. At the 2006 census, its population was 1,013, in 254 families.

References 

Populated places in Esfarayen County